The Constitution Society is a nonprofit educational organization headquartered in San Antonio, Texas, USA.

Constitution Society or The Constitution Society may also refer to:

 The Constitution Society, a UK-based educational charity which aims to educate the public about the British Constitution
 American Constitution Society, a nonprofit advocacy group founded in 2001

See also 
 Society for Constitutional Information, founded in 1780 to promote parliamentary reform